Ignacio Sanuy (1925–1995) was a Spanish musicologist, journalist, lawyer, music critic and historian.

1925 births
1995 deaths
Spanish musicologists
20th-century musicologists